Felícitas Sánchez Aguillón or Sánchez Neyra (1890 – June 16, 1941) was a Mexican nurse, midwife, baby farmer and serial killer, active during the 1930s in Mexico City, who killed babies in her care. Between 40 and 50 murders were attributed to her. She was also known as "The Ogress of Colonia Roma," "The Female Ripper of Colonia Roma" and "The Human Crusher of Little Angels."

Early life
She was born in 1890 in Cerro Azul, Veracruz to a mother who was not affectionate towards her. As a child, she habitually poisoned street dogs.

During the 1900s, she became a licensed nurse and married Carlos Conde. She had twin daughters with him but didn't want to take care of them, and suggested to her husband that they give them up for adoption. He accepted this proposal, but after the daughters had been adopted, he changed his mind. However, Sánchez refused to tell him where their daughters were, which led to their divorce in 1910. In that year Sánchez moved to Mexico City.

Crimes
In Mexico City, she lived in an apartment building located on Salamanca Street, Colonia Roma. She started to attend births and illegally practice abortions. She also began to trade in illegal adoptions. During the 1910s she was arrested twice for practicing illegal adoption and baby farming.

Murders
She killed the children that she couldn't sell and the newborns when the abortion failed. She murdered several children, some by poisoning or strangulation. She dismembered the bodies and incinerated them or threw them in the sewer.

Arrest and death
On April 8, 1941, human remains were discovered near her building. Three days later Sánchez was arrested, along with two accomplices: her second husband Roberto or Alberto Covarrubías and a plumber, Salvador Martínez, who worked for Sánchez.

Sánchez committed suicide before she was tried on July 16, 1941. She and her second husband had a third daughter, who was placed in state care after her father was convicted for involvement in the murders.

See also
List of serial killers by country

References

1890 births
1941 suicides
Drug-related suicides in Mexico
Medical serial killers
Mexican female serial killers
Mexican murderers of children
People from Veracruz
Poisoners
Serial killers who committed suicide in prison custody